Lakhan Thapa Magar (1835–1877) was a Nepali revolutionary whom the Nepalese government has declared "The First Martyr of Nepal". He was the first recorded Nepali political dissident and resisted the rule of the Rana dynasty. As a king of Bungkot, he rebelled against the rule of  Jang Bahadur Rana and propagandized his political ideology to destroy the Jung Bahadur Rana regime to form a free state and army. He was supported by his close friend Jay Singh Chumi Magar and his minister Jaya Singh Chumi.

Kot Massacre of 1846 
The mysterious killing of General Gagan Singh Khawaas followed the Kot Massacre of 14 September 1846 that catapulted the Ranas into power for 104 years. The reigning queen wanted to know the murderer of General Gagan Singh Khawas. General Abhiman Singh Rana Magar, who was the first General or Commander-in-Chief of
Nepal Army had known who the killer was. Upon learning of the general's knowledge, Jung Bahadur Rana subsequently fatally shot the general. However, the dying general shouted about the killer's identity, and afterward, Junga Bahadur Rana was motivated to eliminate all nobles in and out of the royal house. This included ethnic leaders like Lakhan Thapa Magar to secure his position.

Resistance 
After the Rana takeover, Lakhan Thapa Magar could not tolerate the iron-fisted rule of the dynasty. He organized some youths (some ex-military) to begin to protest against the government. Along with men he brought weapons and supplies to rebel against the government. The Rana government responded by deploying troops to Gorkha. Jung Bahadur thought to eliminate Thapa Magar and other rebels and ordered to hang them. After sometime, Thapa Magar was hanged in front of his residence in Bungkot on 14 February 1877 and seven others were hanged near Manakamana Temple.<ref>"आठ पहरिया दलले ती सबै ब्यक्ति र सामान समेत जंग बहादुर लाइ ल्यायर बुझायो | जंगबहादुरलाई शस्त्रास्त्र समेतको  संगठन देखेर निक्कै आश्चर्य  लाग्यो | उनले यस संगठनलाई जरैदेखि निर्मूल पार्ने विचार गरे | निर्मूल पार्ने सबभन्दा सजिलो उपाय थियो संगठन्कर्तालाई   निर्मूल पार्नु | त्यस कारण जंगबहादुरले लखन थापा र उनका ७ जान साथीलाई फासीको सजाय सुनाए  र उनीहरुलाई फैसला सुनाएको निक्कै समय  पछी  लखन थापालाई आफ्नै मठमा  र अरु ७ जनालाई मनकामनामा लगेर झुन्द्याइयो | लखन थापाको मठको विशाल भाग्नावासेश अद्यापि बुग्कोटबाट नाम्जुंग  जाने बाटामा अवस्थित छ  र त्यहाका स्थानीय जनताले बिर्सेका छैनन् |" लखन थापा  द्वितीयको पर्व :  जनक लाल शर्मा २०२० - पन्ना  ९१</ref> Some historians have written that the government had captured and hung 50 other participants. Notably, one of the descendants of Jung Bahadur Rana has disputed Magar's claim to martyrdom. But all renowned historians of Nepal have attested that Lakhan Thapa Magar was hanged to death.

 Legacy 
While historically Lakhan Thapa has been seen as a foolish figure, in the 1990s his image was rehabilitated in the eyes of the public. Historian and then Director General of Nepal Government's Department of Archaeology has written that Jung Bahadur Rana's harsh rule prompted an inevitable revolution. 

Some historians draw a parallel between Lakhan Thapa and Bhagat Singh (Punjabi: ਭਗਤ ਸਿੰਘ بھگت سنگھ]) (28 September 1907 – 23 March 1931) of India as both were prominent political martyrs in their country.

Family tree
Lakhan Thapa Magar's Siblings:
 Ram Thapa Magar (older brother)
 Dhana Mala sister.

Notes

References
 Baidhya, Tulsiram, Vijay Kumar Manandhar and Premsingh Basnyat. 2009. Military History of Nepal (Part 2). Kathmandu: Army Headquarters.
 Bhandari, Dhundi Raj: नेपालको आलोचनात्मक इतिहास Nepalko Aalochanatmak Itihas (A Critical History of Nepal)
 Gurung, Hark - 1998: Nepal : Social Demography and Expression.
 Lecomte-Tilouine, Marie - Oxford University Press - 2008: Hindu Kingship, Ethnic Revival and Maoist Rebellion in Nepal
 Lecomte-Tilouine, Marie: Utopia and Ideology among the Magars: Lakhan Thapa versus Mao Dzedong?
 Rana, B. K. 2003: संक्षिप्त मगर इतिहास Sanchhipta Magar Itihas (A Concise History of Magars)
 Rana, B. K. 2012 : MARTYR LAKHAN THAPA OF NEPAL: FROM A NATIVE PERSPECTIVE
 Rana, Pudma Jung Bahadur - 1909: Life of Maharaja Sir Jung Bahadur of Nepal. The Pioneer Press Allahbad
 Rana, Promod Sumsher - 1978 : Rana Nepal - An Insider's View
 Sharma, Bal Chandra : नेपालको ऐतिहासिक रुपरेखा Nepalko Aitihasik Ruprekha (Glimpses of Nepalese History)
 Sharma, Janak Lal -1964 : जोसमनी सन्त-परम्परा र साहित्य - २०२० -Josmani Sanit-Parampara Ra Sahitya 1964'' - Josmani Saint Tradition and Literature - 1964.
 Singh, Bhim Bhaktaman - 2005: Nepal

External links
 Magar Morcha
 MARTYR LAKHAN THAPA OF NEPAL: FROM A NATIVE PERSPECTIVE
 Celebration of Martyrs’ Day In Nepal
 Martyrs, Martyrdom and Martyr Lakhan Thapa
 Martyrs, Freedom Fighters and Brave Children of Nepal
 Hindu Kingship, Ethnic Revival and Maoist Rebellion in Nepal:
 Even today, Lakhan Thapa is remembered as the first Nepali martyr
 Martyrs, Martyrdom and Martyr Lakhan Thapa
 Bagchi-Levi in Nepal A Glimpse of the Rana Rule in Nepal, Manindra Bhushan Bhaduri The Calcutta Review July 1962

History of Nepal
Nepalese revolutionaries
People from Gorkha District
Executed Nepalese people
People executed by Nepal by hanging
1835 births
1877 deaths
Executed revolutionaries
Nepalese martyrs